Afif Football Club is an association football club based in Afif, Saudi Arabia. Founded in 1976, the club plays in the Saudi Second Division.

Current squad 
As of Saudi Second Division:

References

External links
 Afief F.C. at Kooora.com

Afif
1976 establishments in Saudi Arabia
Association football clubs established in 1976
Football clubs in Afif